SRV school may refer to:
 SRV School, Namakkal, Tamil Nadu, India
 Sree Rama Varma High School, Kerala, India

See also
 SR V Schools class, a class of steam locomotive, United Kingdom
 SRV Matriculation Higher Secondary School, Samayapuram, Trichy, Tamil Nadu, India